Love Their Country is the fifth studio album, and sixth overall by Me First and the Gimme Gimmes. It was released on October 17, 2006, by Fat Wreck Chords.  The album consists of cover versions of country and western songs.

Prior to its release, a Fat Wreck Chords press release had stated that the album would range from "the Dixie Chicks to Garth [Brooks], Hank [Williams] Sr. to [Johnny] Cash." A cover of the "(Ghost) Riders in the Sky" was featured on iFloyd, a sampler released by Fat Wreck Chords.

Like their previous four albums, The Gimmes interpolate punk rock classics in their covers. Willie Nelson's "On the Road Again" uses the intro riff of "Astro Zombies" by The Misfits; "Sunday Morning Coming Down" adapts its arrangement from The Clash's rendition of "Police and Thieves"; "East Bound And Down" includes some of The Damned's "Love Song."

Track listing

Personnel
 Spike Slawson - vocals
 Chris Shiflett (a.k.a. Jake Jackson) - lead guitar
 Joey Cape - rhythm guitar
 Fat Mike - bass
 Dave Raun - drums

Additional musicians
 Brendan Allen - bagpipes on "I'm So Lonesome I Could Cry"

See also 
Me First and the Gimme Gimmes discography

References 

Me First and the Gimme Gimmes albums
2006 albums
Fat Wreck Chords albums